Shakugan no Shana is an anime series including three television series, original video animation (OVA) episodes, and bonus shorts. The episodes are based on the light novel series of the same name written by Yashichiro Takahashi, with illustrations drawn by Noizi Ito. Produced by the animation studio J.C.Staff, the episodes are directed by Takashi Watanabe, written by Yasuko Kobayashi, and feature character design by Mai Otsuka who based the designs on Ito's original concept. The sound director is Jin Aketagawa, and the soundtrack is composed by Kow Otani. The story follows Yuji Sakai, a high school boy who inadvertently becomes involved in an age-old conflict between forces of balance and imbalance in existence. In the process, he befriends a fighter for the balancing force and names her "Shana".

A 24-episode TV series aired in Japan between October 6, 2005, and March 23, 2006, on TV Kanagawa, and aired at later dates than TV Kanagawa on TV Saitama, Chiba TV, MBS TV, TV Aichi, and Animax. A DVD titled Shakugan no Shana: Prelude to Shana containing promotional material for the anime was released in September 2005. The series was later released by Geneon to eight DVD compilation volumes from January to August 2006. Two DVD box sets containing 12 episode each were released in January and February 2011. A Blu-ray Disc (BD) box set was released in June 2011. Later, an OVA episode titled Shakugan no Shana SP, which takes place after the events of episode 13, was released on December 8, 2006.

The series was licensed for North American distribution by Geneon, who released the series on 6 DVD volumes from September 5, 2006, to July 3, 2007. After Geneon withdrew from the North American market, Geneon and Funimation Entertainment announced an agreement to distribute select titles in North America. While Geneon still retains the license, Funimation assumes exclusive rights to the manufacturing, marketing, sales and distribution of select titles. Shakugan no Shana was one of several titles involved in the deal. A DVD box set was released by Funimation in September 2008, and was re-released in September 2009 under Funimation's "Viridian Collection". Funimation later re-licensed the first series and re-released the series on a BD and DVD combo pack in August 2012. Animax began broadcasting the English version in South and Southeast Asia on July 1, 2009.

The same core production staff who produced the first season of Shakugan no Shana returned for later projects. The 24-episode second season, titled , aired between October 5, 2007, and March 28, 2008, on MBS, and aired at later dates than MBS on CBC, TBS, Bandai Channel, and Animax. The series was later released by Geneon to eight DVD compilation volumes from January to August 2008. Two DVD box sets containing 12 episode each were released in February and April 2011. A BD box set was released in September 2011. In the Philippines, TV5 was the first to telecast the second season in Southeast Asia between November 10 and December 25, 2008. A four-episode OVA series titled Shakugan no Shana S was released on BD/DVD from October 23, 2009, to September 29, 2010. The 24-episode third season, titled , aired between October 8, 2011, and March 24, 2012, on Tokyo MX, and aired at later dates than Tokyo MX on Chiba TV, TV Kanagawa, MBS, CBC, AT-X, and BS11. The series was released by Geneon to eight BD/DVD compilation volumes from December 2011 to July 2012. Funimation licensed the second and third seasons, and the OVA series.

A series of 15 bonus shorts depicting Shana super deformed under the collective title Shakugan no Shana-tan were also released. The first two were available to those who reserved copies of the first and fifth Japanese DVD volumes of the first season. Both episodes were included in the sixth English DVD volume. A similarly themed short featuring Hecate was released on a DVD bundled with the Anime Shakugan no Shana no Subete guide book. Another short was released with the Shakugan no Shana SP OVA, and one featuring Wilhelmina was shown in Japanese theaters with the film. A Shana-tan short was included with the limited edition version of the film's DVD. Two more were available with the limited edition versions of the first and fifth Japanese DVD volumes of the second season. Shakugan no Shana-tan Revenge was included with the Anime Shakugan no Shana II no Subete guide book. Four more were included with each of the Shakugan no Shana S BDs and DVDs. Another short was available with the limited edition version of the second Japanese BD and DVD volume of the third season. There was also a series of 20 animated shorts featuring Friagne and Marianne called .

Anime series

Shakugan no Shana (2005—06)

Shakugan no Shana Second (2007–08)

Shakugan no Shana S (2009–10)

Shakugan no Shana Final (2011–12)

Mini-specials

Shakugan no Shana specials

Shakugan no Shana Second specials

Shakugan no Shana S specials

Shakugan no Shana Final specials

References

Shakugan no Shana
Episodes